Queens County is a county in the Canadian province of Nova Scotia.

History
Liverpool, the county seat of Queens County, was founded in 1759 by the New England Planters. Founded for the most part by New England settlers, Liverpool maintained strong ties with the American colonies until the sudden outbreak of the American Revolution.

On July 21, 1762 the Lieutenant Governor and Council of Nova Scotia declared that "the Townships of Liverpool, Barrington and Yarmouth together with the intermediate lands should be erected into a county by the name of Queens County". Parts of the new county were taken from Lunenburg County, which now lies to the northeast.

In 1784, Shelburne County was formed in part from southwestern portions of Queens County. The new county boundaries were established by an Order-in-Council dated December 16, 1785.

Queens County contains substantial portions of Kejimkujik National Park, including the main body of the park inland north of Caledonia and the Seaside Adjunct near Port Joli and Port Mouton.

In 1996, the county's municipal government merged with the town of Liverpool to form the Region of Queens Municipality, thus the county is contiguous with the boundaries of the regional municipality, minus First Nations reserves.

Demographics 

Ethnic Groups (2006)

Communities

Regional municipalities
Region of Queens Municipality

Towns
Liverpool

Villages
Caledonia
Greenfield

Reserves
Ponhook Lake 10
Wildcat 12

See also

List of lakes in Nova Scotia
Black Lake listings within Nova Scotia.

References

 
Former county municipalities in Nova Scotia